USS Guide (AMc-83) was an Accentor-class coastal minesweeper acquired by the U.S. Navy for the dangerous task of removing mines from minefields laid in the water to prevent ships from passing.

Guide was launched 20 September 1941 by the Camden Shipbuilding & Marine Railway Co., Camden, Maine.

World War II service
Guide trained from the Mine Warfare School at Yorktown, Virginia, until 17 April 1942 when she sailed to alternately sweep the main shipping channels leading out of Key West, Florida, New Orleans, Louisiana, and Mobile, Alabama. She periodically made brief visits to Pensacola, Florida, for special sweeping duties.

Her homeport changed from Mobile to Naval Station, Burrwood, Louisiana, in July 1944. She continued sweeping the approaches to New Orleans, Louisiana, and Mobile until July 1945. She then served the Mine Countermeasures Station at Panama City, Florida, for the remainder of her career.

Post war inactivation and disposal
Guide was placed out of service 12 June 1946 and her name was struck from the Navy List 3 July. She was sold to a private purchaser 11 April 1947.

References

External links
 NavSource Online: Mine Warfare Vessel Photo Archive - Guide (AMc 83)

 

Accentor-class minesweepers
World War II mine warfare vessels of the United States
Ships built in Camden, Maine
1941 ships